The decade of the 1690s in archaeology involved some significant events.

Explorations

Excavations

Finds
 1693 - Alfred Jewel discovered at North Petherton in Somerset, England.
 1697 - Commemorative stela of Nahr el-Kalb discovered in Lebanon by Henry Maundrell.

Events
 1693 - John Aubrey completes his  in manuscript.
 1694 - Maltese canon Ignazio di Costanzo reports in a letter that the Cippi of Melqart bear an inscription in the Phoenician alphabet.

Births
 1690: February 3 - Richard Rawlinson, English antiquarian (d. 1755)
 1692: October 31 - Anne Claude de Caylus, French archaeologist (d. 1765)
 1696: Francis Drake, English antiquary (d. 1771)

Deaths
 1697: John Aubrey, English antiquary (b. 1626)
 1698: Giovanni Giustino Ciampini, Italian archaeologist (b. 1633)

References

Archaeology by decade
Archaeology